Sportpark Harga is a cricket ground in Schiedam, Netherlands.  The first recorded match on the ground came in 1968 when the Netherlands Under-23s played the Marylebone Cricket Club.  The ground hosted various touring international sides in the 1980s, while in 1990 it held seven matches in the ICC Trophy.  In 2003, the ground held a Women's One Day International when the Netherlands Women played Japan Women at the IWCC Trophy. In September 2020, a turf ground was installed, giving the facility a total of six pitches, with the aim to host One Day International (ODI) matches in the future.

References

External links
Sportpark Harga at ESPNcricinfo
Sportpark Harga at CricketArchive

Cricket grounds in the Netherlands
Sports venues in South Holland
Buildings and structures in Schiedam
Sport in Schiedam